Friedrich Auerbach (23 August 1870, Breslau – 4 August 1925) was a German chemist. He was the son of anatomist Leopold Auerbach and the brother of physicist Felix Auerbach. He was the father of geneticist Charlotte Auerbach.

Biography 
He studied mathematics, physics and chemistry at the universities of Leipzig and Breslau — at Leipzig his instructors were Johannes Wislicenus and Wilhelm Ostwald; at Breslau he was a student of Albert Ladenburg. From 1894 to 1903 he was associated with factories in Edenkoben and Krefeld, and afterwards worked in the chemical laboratory of Richard Abegg at Breslau. From 1904 he worked at the Reich Health Office in Berlin, where he eventually attained the position of Oberregierungsrat.

Much of his scientific research dealt with poisons, in particular, issues concerning lead poisoning. With Richard Abegg, he was author of a multi-volume manual on inorganic chemistry, titled "Handbuch der anorganischen Chemie". After Abegg's death in 1910, he became its sole editor.

Published works 
 Ueber ein neues Collidin und eine Pipecolincarbonsäure, 1893 – About a new collidine and a pipercolic carboxylic acid.
 Handbuch der anorganischen Chemie, 4 volumes 1905-21 (with Ivan Koppel and Richard Abegg) – Handbook of inorganic chemistry.  
 Messungen elektromotorischer kräfte galvanischer ketten mit wässerigen elektrolyten, 1911 (with Richard Abegg and Robert Thomas Dietrich Luther) – Measurements of electromotive force galvanic chains with aqueous electrolytes.
 Umsetzungen schwerlöslicher Bleisalze mit wässerigen Lösungen kohlensaurer Alkalien, (with Hans Pick) 1913 – Reactions of slightly soluble lead salts with aqueous solutions of carbonated alkalis.
 Die neuen Wandlungen der Theorie der elektrolytischen Dissoziation, 1922 – On new changes involving the theory of electrolytic dissociation.

References

External links
 

1870 births
1925 deaths
University of Breslau alumni
Academic staff of Leipzig University
Scientists from Wrocław
20th-century German chemists
Auerbach family
19th-century German chemists